The Greek Football Cup, commonly known as the Greek Cup or Kypello Elladas is a Greek football competition, run by the Hellenic Football Federation.

The Greek Cup is the second-most important domestic men's football event, after the championship of Super League. The organizing authority of the institution is the Hellenic Football Federation (EPO). Since its inception in 1931 it has been held 80 times, in which cup winner emerged 79.

Olympiacos is the most successful club having reached the final 42 times and earning 28 trophies.

History

The Greek Cup under EPO began in 1931. In its early years, entry was optional. Teams were paired against each other by the football associations, without a draw taking place. Later on, for many years, a proper draw took place and also two-legged matches were added.

The participation of Olympiacos and Panathinaikos in the final 1962 is counted for both as the presence of a finalist, since the match was stopped due to darkness in overtime (0-0). Due to the incidents between the players of the two teams, the incidents in the stands, the excessive delays and the suspicion that all this was intentional for the match to be repeated and for the teams to make bigger profits, the GGA council decided to punish the EPO with a reprimand and banned the replay of the match as a penalty for both teams

Until 1964, if the final score was a draw (including extra time), the two teams played a replay match, while penalties didn't exist. That year, in the semi-final between Panathinaikos and Olympiacos (1–1 at the time),fans of both teams stormed the pitch, damaged the football field and virtually stopped the game, believing that it was fixed to end in a draw, in order to be replayed for financial reasons. Both teams were ejected from the competition and therefore, in 1964 AEK won the title but the final match was not held. AEK also won in similar fashion in 1966 when Olympiacos did not show up in the final.

In 1965, a new rule was applied, to determine that, if the game was undecided even after extra time, the winner would be determined by the toss of a coin. Panathinaikos won this way in the 1969 final against Olympiacos
. Afterwards the penalty shootout was applied.
Until 1971, teams from all over the country, professional and amateur, had been taking part. Each team first played against clubs from its own association and the winners continued in a nationwide competition. Due to this, strong professional sides met amateur neighbourhood teams, sometimes beating them with high scores; a 23–0 win in an Apollon Athens vs. PAO Neas Melandias match on 23 September 1959 remains a record win for the Greek Cup until today. Since 1971, only teams from professional divisions are allowed to participate, while amateur clubs take part in the Amateur Cup.

In 1991 and 1992 the finals were two-legged matches.

It is widely considered that the most exciting match in the history of the competition was the 2009 final between Olympiacos and AEK (3–3 full time, 4–4 after extra time and 15–14 on penalties).

Cup Winners

11 clubs have won the Greek Cup.

 1931–32: AEK
 1932–33: Ethnikos
 1938–39: AEK
 1939–40: Panathinaikos
 1946–47: Olympiacos
 1947–48: Panathinaikos
 1948–49: AEK
 1949–50: AEK
 1950–51: Olympiacos
 1951–52: Olympiacos
 1952–53: Olympiacos
 1953–54: Olympiacos
 1954–55: Panathinaikos
 1955–56: AEK
 1956–57: Olympiacos
 1957–58: Olympiacos
 1958–59: Olympiacos
 1959–60: Olympiacos
 1960–61: Olympiacos
 1961–62: –
 1962–63: Olympiacos
 1963–64: AEK
 1964–65: Olympiacos
 1965–66: AEK
 1966–67: Panathinaikos
 1967–68: Olympiacos
 1968–69: Panathinaikos
 1969–70: Aris
 1970–71: Olympiacos
 1971–72: PAOK
 1972–73: Olympiacos
 1973–74: PAOK
 1974–75: Olympiacos
 1975–76: Iraklis
 1976–77: Panathinaikos
 1977–78: AEK
 1978–79: Panionios
 1979–80: Kastoria
 1980–81: Olympiacos
 1981–82: Panathinaikos
 1982–83: AEK
 1983–84: Panathinaikos
 1984–85: AEL
 1985–86: Panathinaikos
 1986–87: OFI
 1987–88: Panathinaikos
 1988–89: Panathinaikos
 1989–90: Olympiacos
 1990–91: Panathinaikos
 1991–92: Olympiacos
 1992–93: Panathinaikos
 1993–94: Panathinaikos
 1994–95: Panathinaikos
 1995–96: AEK
 1996–97: AEK
 1997–98: Panionios
 1998–99: Olympiacos
 1999–00: AEK
 2000–01: PAOK
 2001–02: AEK
 2002–03: PAOK
 2003–04: Panathinaikos
 2004–05: Olympiacos
 2005–06: Olympiacos
 2006–07: AEL
 2007–08: Olympiacos
 2008–09: Olympiacos
 2009–10: Panathinaikos
 2010–11: AEK
 2011–12: Olympiacos
 2012–13: Olympiacos
 2013–14: Panathinaikos
 2014–15: Olympiacos
 2015–16: AEK
 2016–17: PAOK
 2017–18: PAOK
 2018–19: PAOK
 2019–20: Olympiacos
 2020–21: PAOK
 2021–22: Panathinaikos

Notes:
• In 1933–38 and 1940–46, the competition was not held (in 1940–41, only the first round was played).
• In 1961–62, the final match between Olympiacos and Panathinaikos was abandoned and the Cup withheld.
• In 1963–64 and 1965–66, the Final was scratched.
• In 80 editions of the competition, 79 have concluded with a Cup winner, and 78 finals have been played (one was abandoned).

Performance by club
19 clubs have reached the Greek Cup final.

Total titles won by city 

11 clubs have won the Greek Football Cup, from a total of 6 cities.

See also 
 Greek Super League
 Greek Super Cup
 Greek League Cup

References

External links
Cup at UEFA
RSSSF

 
Cup
Greece
1931 establishments in Greece